Al-Dawasir (Arabic: الدواسر) is an Arab tribe whose main base is in the south of Najd in the governorates of Wadi Al-Dawasir, Al-Sulail, Al-Aflaj, and Al-Kharj. The tribe is divided into two groups, namely Al Zayed (Azd) and Taghlib. Al Zayed (Azd) section of divides into Al Salem, and they are Al Wadian,  Al-Rajban, Al-Makharim, and Al-Badarin. Taghlib section of Al Dawasir divides into Al Mohamed, Al Amoor, Al Khayilat, Al Ali, Al Lahqban, and Al Masair. The Al-Dawasir tribe combines civilization and nomadism. On the one hand, they are Bedouins who own camels and cattle. On the other hand, they are present with date palms, cities and farms, and their land is one of the most fertile and waterlogged in the  Arabian Peninsula.

Nomenclature
There are various theories surrounding the definition and origin of the term Dawasir, the two most popular ones being that it was derived from either the name of the tribe's purported forebear Dosser or the eponymous Arabic word which translates to "soldiers". Other sources include other terms such as the Arabic word for Lion or a type of Arabian horse.

History

South of Najd
Ibn Fadlallah al-Umari, one of the 14th century historians, mentioned that the Mamluk Sultan Al-Nasir Muhammad Qalawun sent to the Dawasir tribe to buy some horses, and their Sheikh was called Rawa bin Badran.

Bahrain
The Dawasir migrated to Bahrain in 1845 from Zakhnuniya Island, south of Uqair and mainly settled in and around Zallaq and Budaiya. American author Yitzhak Nakash, a prominent expert on the history of Shiism, described the tribe in his book Reaching for Power: The Shi'a in the Modern Arab World as being the "second largest and most powerful tribe after the Utub [in Bahrain]. So powerful were the Dawasir that their members recognized Sheikh 'Isa Al Khalifa as ruler in name only and considered themselves immune from taxation." Members of the tribe worked in the pearl industry and opposed the overthrow of Sheikh Isa ibn Ali Al Khalifa. Virtually all members of the tribe left Bahrain for Dammam after suspecting that the new ruler, Sheikh Hamad ibn Isa would attempt to tighten his control over them with British support and force them into submitting to his rule in 1923. The Dawasir were officially allowed to return in April 1927 by Sheikh Hamad after being requested by Ibn Saud to do so.

Years after the deportation of the Dawasir, a number of Huwala families arrived in Bahrain from southern Iran (mainly from the village of Chah Kutah), claiming to be members of the Dumkooh clan. Their origin is disputed by some Dawasir scholars such as Sahood Aldosseri who deny claims put forward by apologists which assert that some Dumkooh clansmen are of Iranian origin because there are no records proving that an immigration of such a powerful clan would occur without any records remaining.

Branches of Dawasir
They are a tribal confederation of three main tribes that allied with each other.

Al Wadaan  

bin Salem (Al Wadain). The belly of the farewell is divided into two thighs, which are:

Al Shammas bin Ghanem. They live in the Al Shimasiyah governorate in Al-Qassim Province region, in the return of Sudair, in the Safrat Center in the Thadiq Governorate, in the Quraina in Huraymila, and throughout the Qassim region.

Al Ghanem bin Nasser bin Daan, and this thigh is divided into seven factions:

Al Khamis bin Ghanem (The Khamasin). They live in the Al-Khamaseen and the Northern Khamisin centers in Wadi Al-Dawasir Governorate.

Al Dawas bin Ghanem. They live in Al-Silil, Al-Dawasiyah Center, and Al-Fara’a in Wadi Al-Dawasir Governorate.

Al Rashid bin Ghanem (Al Rawashdah). They live in “Al-Qa’iya” west of the center of Naajan and Al-Sahnah in the Al-Dalam governorate, Al-Kharj governorate, “Hammam’s migration” in Al-Sulayl, and “Al-Rashidiya” in Al-Kharj.

Al Zayed bin Ghanem. They live in the governorate of Wadi Al-Dawasir, the Al-Awaimer center, and the “Khalidiya” migration in Wadi Al-Dawasir, and Al-Silil.

Al Swailem bin Ghanem. And they live in Al-Sail and Wadi Al-Dawasir.

Al Wolman Bin Ghanem (Al Wollamin). They live in Al-Walamin Center and Al-Fara'a in Wadi Al-Dawasir.

Al-Haqiq bin Nasser bin Da'an: Al Khamis bin Haqib and they are (Al Hajji bin Khamis, and Al Dowayan bin Khamis). They live in Al Hajji Center, Al Hamel Center, “Al Dowayan Center” and Khairan and in Al-Sulayl Governorate.
The Maan bin Haqiq family and are (the Khalif bin Maan family, and the Dulaim bin Maan family). They live in the Al Hanish Center, the Al Muhammad Center, the Al Khalif Center, and Al Khaldiyah in the Al-Sail Governorate, in Al-Juba, and in the Al-Wadain Center in the Al-Aflaj Governorate.

Al-Zayed
Their homes were in ancient history, in the Ma'rib region, a tribe of Azd Bani Mazin branch. They allied with the al-Jaid trib who belong to Hamdan tribe and moved from their homes to Wadi al-Dawasir in the 9th century and early 10th century.

Taghlib
They were vulnerable in Wadi Al-Dawasir by the tribe of Bani Aqeel, but when Al-Zayd from the south of Arabia came to the valley they liberated them and later joined Al-Dawasir, most of them came early

Al-Jamailat
They are part of the banu Taghlib bin Halwan tribe.

Notable people
Among the tribe's members are: 
 Khalid Abdulrahman, Saudi singer 
 Sara bint Ahmed Al Sudairi, mother of King Abdulaziz, founder of the Third Saudi State 
 Hussa bint Ahmed Al Sudairi, the mother of King Fahd and King Salman, as well as the mother of Sultan, Abdul Rahman, Nayef, Turki and Ahmed 
 Saud al-Dosari, Saudi television presenter
 Abdallah Ben Abdel Mohsen At-Turki, Secretary General of the Muslim World League and Minister of Minister of Islamic Affairs, Dawah and Guidance

See also
 Tribes of Arabia
 Arabian tribes that interacted with Muhammad

References

External links

Tribes of Arabia
Tribes of Saudi Arabia
Bedouin groups